The 2003 LPGA Tour was the 54th season since the LPGA Tour officially began in 1950. The season ran from March 13 to November 23. The season consisted of 31 official money events. Annika Sörenstam won the most tournaments, six. She also led the money list with earnings of $2,029,506, becoming the first player to earn over $2,000,000 in a season.

There were five first-time winners in 2003: Shi Hyun Ahn, Hee-Won Han, Candie Kung, Hilary Lunke, and Angela Stanford. Lunke's was most notable, as she won the U.S. Women's Open after enduring local and section qualifying for what would become her only LPGA Tour victory.

The tournament results, leaders, and award winners are listed below.

Tournament results
The following table shows all the official money events for the 2003 season. "Date" is the ending date of the tournament. The numbers in parentheses after the winners' names are the number of wins they had on the tour up to and including that event. Majors are shown in bold.

* – non-member at time of win

Leaders
Money List leaders

Full 2003 Official Money List

Awards

References

External links
LPGA Tour official site
2003 season coverage at golfobserver.com

LPGA Tour seasons
LPGA Tour